This is an alphabetical list of officially released songs by the late R&B singer Aaliyah (1979–2001).

Songs

Notes

References

Aaliyah
 

fr:Discographie d'Aaliyah
hu:Aaliyah-diszkográfia